Ischalia is a genus of broad-hipped flower beetles in the family Ischaliidae, and the only genus of the subfamily Ischaliinae. There are at least 3 described species in Ischalia.

Species
 Ischalia californica Van Dyke, 1938
 Ischalia costata (LeConte, 1861)
 Ischalia vancouverensis Harrington, 1892

References

Further reading

 
 
 

Tenebrionoidea